Paul Grimball House Ruins is a historic archaeological site located at Edisto Island, Charleston County, South Carolina.  The stuccoed tabby house was built about 1682. In August 1686, the house was occupied, sacked, and possibly burned by the Spanish on a raid up the North Edisto River. The remains consist of a 12 feet high corner portion of a stucco covered tabby wall.

It was listed on the National Register of Historic Places in 1986.

References

Archaeological sites on the National Register of Historic Places in South Carolina
Buildings and structures in Charleston County, South Carolina
National Register of Historic Places in Charleston County, South Carolina
Tabby buildings